Krynki is a town in Podlaskie Voivodeship in north-eastern Poland.

Krynki may also refer to the following villages:
Krynki, Masovian Voivodeship (east-central Poland)
Krynki, Świętokrzyskie Voivodeship (south-central Poland)

See also